Mamadou Diarra (born August 29, 1986) is a Malian retired basketball player.

Profile
Mamadou Diarra is a talented player with great athletic skills. Possessing a 7'6" wingspan and the size to make him a force in the middle, he also has a good shot from 4–5 meters, can run the floor, and has a variety of low-post moves.

College and professional career
In 2006, Diarra moved to the United States, where he enrolled at Stoneridge Preparatory School in Simi Valley, California. Later, he played college basketball for the USC and the Chaminade University of Honolulu.

After not being selected at the 2011 NBA Draft, he moved to Spain to play for Oviedo CB. He has also played for Malabo Kings of the D-1 league of Equatorial Guinea.

International career
Diarra has competed for Mali through multiple junior national teams, and participated at the AfroBasket 2011.

References

External links
 Mamadou Diarra at Fiba.com
 Mamadou Diarra - Video

1986 births
Living people
Malian men's basketball players
Sportspeople from Bamako
Centers (basketball)
Oviedo CB players
Malabo Kings players
21st-century Malian people